Timur Rasikhovich Nadrov (born January 3, 1995) is a Russian professional boxer and kickboxer.

Titles
Professional
2017 W5 World -60kg Champion
2015 WKF World -60kg Champion

Amateur
2017 WAKO World Championships K-1 -60kg 
2016 WAKO European Championships K-1 -60kg

Fight record 

|-  bgcolor="#CCFFCC"
| 2017-10-07 || Win ||align=left| Chen Wende || ACB KB 11 / Wu Lin Feng || Zhengzhou, China || Decision (Unanimous)|| 3 || 3:00
|-
|-  bgcolor="#CCFFCC"
| 2017-02-18 || Win ||align=left| Sergio Wielzen || W5 Grand Prix KITEK XXXIX || Moscow, Russia || TKO (Ref Stoppage/Right Hook) || 2 || 
|-
! style=background:white colspan=9 |
|-  bgcolor="#CCFFCC"
| 2016-09-16 || Win ||align=left| Abdul Ayubov|| Strong Russia|| Russia || Decision || 3 || 3:00
|-  bgcolor="#CCFFCC"
| 2016-05-28 || Win ||align=left| Igor Grakhov || Strong Russia|| Russia || Decision || 3 || 3:00
|-  bgcolor="#CCFFCC"
| 2016-04-30 || Win ||align=left| Magomed Saidov || Legacy || Russia || Decision || 3 || 3:00
|-  bgcolor="#CCFFCC"
| 2016-02-27 || Win ||align=left| Zukhrab Azimov || ACB KB 5: Let's Knock The Winter Out || Orel, Russia || Decision (Unanimous)|| 3 || 3:00
|-  bgcolor="#CCFFCC"
| 2015-09-04 || Win ||align=left| Alberto Simon Montero|| Battle of Champions 8|| Russia || TKO (Low kicks) || 7 ||  
|-
! style=background:white colspan=9 |
|-  bgcolor="#CCFFCC"
| 2015 || Win ||align=left| Sergey Luchenko|| 12th USSR Martial Arts Championship|| Russia || TKO (Knee) ||  ||
|-  bgcolor="#CCFFCC"
| 2015-04-25 || Win ||align=left| Hamza Bougmza|| ACB KB 1: Grand Prix Quarter-Finals|| Grozny, Russia || Decision ||3 || 3:00
|-  bgcolor="#CCFFCC"
| 2015-03-13 || Win ||align=left| Zohrab Azimov|| Heydar Aliyev Cup|| Saint Petersburg, Russia || Decision (Split) ||3 || 3:00
|-  bgcolor="#CCFFCC"
| 2015-02-16 || Win ||align=left| Hasan Khudoyberdiev|| Heydar Aliyev Cup|| Podolsk, Russia || KO (Right Hook to the Body) ||1||
|-  bgcolor="#FFBBBB"
| 2014-09-27 || Loss ||align=left| Nikos Xysen||Urban Fighters 6 || Greece || Decision || 3 || 3:00
|-  bgcolor="#CCFFCC"
| 2014-09-07 || Win ||align=left| Vadim Chasovskikh || || Russia || Decision || 5 || 3:00
|-  bgcolor="#CCFFCC"
| 2014 || Win ||align=left| Immam Abdullaev||GPRO-16 || Russia || Decision || 3 || 3:00
|-  bgcolor="#CCFFCC"
| 2014-04-26 || Win ||align=left| Sadic ||  || Voronezh, Vladivostok, Russia || TKO (Corner Stoppage) || 2 || 3:00 
|-
|-
| colspan=9 | Legend:    

|-  bgcolor="#CCFFCC"
| 2018-07-29 || Win ||align=left| Ibragim Abdulmedzhidov||  || Russia || Decision (Unanimous)|| 5 || 3:00 
|-
! style=background:white colspan=9 |
|-  bgcolor="#CCFFCC"
| 2018-05-18 || Win ||align=left| Ramadan Baskanov ||  || Tomsk, Russia || Decision || 5 || 3:00 
|-
! style=background:white colspan=9 |
|-  bgcolor="#CCFFCC"
| 2017-11-11 || Win ||align=left| Michal Krolik || 2017 WAKO World Championship, Final || Budapest, Hungary || Decision || 3 || 2:00 
|-
! style=background:white colspan=9 |
|-  bgcolor="#CCFFCC"
| 2017-11-10 || Win ||align=left| Thomas Tadlanek || 2017 WAKO World Championship, Semi Final || Budapest, Hungary || Decision || 3 || 2:00
|-  bgcolor="#CCFFCC"
| 2017-11-08 || Win ||align=left| Antonio Faria || 2017 WAKO World Championship, Quarter Final || Budapest, Hungary || Decision || 3 || 2:00
|-  bgcolor="#CCFFCC"
| 2017-04-05 || Win ||align=left| Temirlan Bekmurazev || 2016 Russia Championship, Final || Russia || Decision || 3 || 2:00
|-  bgcolor="#CCFFCC"
| 2017-04-05 || Win ||align=left| Argishti Mkrtumyan || 2016 Russia Championship, Semi Final || Russia || Decision || 3 || 2:00
|-  bgcolor="#CCFFCC"
| 2016-10-29 || Win ||align=left| Michal Krolik || 2016 WAKO European Championship, Final || Maribor, Slovenia || Decision || 3 || 2:00 
|-
! style=background:white colspan=9 |
|-  bgcolor="#FFBBBB"
| 2015-10-30 || Loss ||align=left| Chingiskhan Tlemissov || 2015 WAKO World Championship, Semi Final || Belgrade, Serbia || Decision || 3 || 3:00
|-  bgcolor="#CCFFCC"
| 2015-10-29 || Win ||align=left| Michal Krolik || 2015 WAKO World Championship, Quarter Final || Belgrade, Serbia || KO (Left Knee to the Body)|| 3 ||
|-  bgcolor="#CCFFCC"
| 2014-04-04 || Win ||align=left| Temirlan Bekmurzaev ||  || Grozny, Russia || Decision || 3 || 3:00 
|-
|-
| colspan=9 | Legend:

Professional Boxing record

See also 
List of male kickboxers

References

1995 births
Living people
Russian male kickboxers
Sportspeople from Moscow